Hurt is a 2018 American slasher film directed by Sonny Mallhi and written by Solomon Gray and Mallhi. The film stars Emily van Raay and Andrew Creer.

It had its world premiere at the Fantasia International Film Festival on July 26, 2018. It was released on December 10, 2018 by Gravitas Ventures.

Plot

Rose moves into a house in the woods close to her sister after her boyfriend gets deployed and things do not go right when Halloween night arrives.

Cast
 Emily van Raay as Rose
 Andrew Creer as Tommy 
 Michelle Treacy as Dana
 Stephanie Moran as Lily
 Bradley Hamilton as Mark
 Madelaine Gionet as Natalie

Filming
Principal photography on the film began in May 2017.

Release
It had its world premiere at the Fantasia International Film Festival on July 26, 2018. It was released on December 10, 2018 by Gravitas Ventures.

See also 
 List of films set around Halloween
 Holiday horror

References

External links 
 
 

2018 horror films
2010s teen horror films
2018 horror thriller films
American slasher films
American psychological horror films
American psychological thriller films
American horror thriller films
Blumhouse Productions films
Halloween horror films
2010s English-language films
2010s American films